Hinkhouse Peak is a  mountain summit located on the shared border of Okanogan County and Chelan County in Washington state. It is part of the Okanogan Range which is a sub-range of the North Cascades Range. Hinkhouse Peak is situated on land administered by the Okanogan–Wenatchee National Forest. The nearest higher neighbor is Liberty Bell Mountain,  to the south. Hinkhouse Peak is situated north of Washington Pass, at the east end of a high ridge which connects to Cutthroat Peak. A high ridge extending northeast connects it to Constitution Crags. Most precipitation runoff from the peak drains into Early Winters Creek which is a tributary of the Methow River, but the south slope drains into a tributary of the Chelan River.

History

The peak's name honors Jimmy D. Hinkhouse (1943–1995), a Washington state mountaineer, economist with the Boeing Corporation in Seattle, and founder of One Step at a Time, a local mountaineering club/12-step substance abuse recovery program. He died of hypothermia at age 52 while climbing Mount McKinley. This geographical feature's name was officially adopted in 2001 by the United States Board on Geographic Names. Prior to that the peak had several variant names such as State Crag, Towers of the Throat Gripper, Fickle Peak, and Washington Pass Peak.

Climate
Hinkhouse Peak is located in the marine west coast climate zone of western North America. Most weather fronts originate in the Pacific Ocean, and travel northeast toward the Cascade Mountains. As fronts approach the North Cascades, they are forced upward by the peaks of the Cascade Range, causing them to drop their moisture in the form of rain or snowfall onto the Cascades (Orographic lift). As a result, the west side of the North Cascades experiences high precipitation, especially during the winter months in the form of snowfall. During winter months, weather is usually cloudy, but, due to high pressure systems over the Pacific Ocean that intensify during summer months, there is often little or no cloud cover during the summer. Because of maritime influence, snow tends to be wet and heavy, resulting in high avalanche danger. The North Cascades Highway east of Washington Pass has the distinction of being among the top areas in the United States for most avalanche paths per mile of highway.

Geology
The North Cascades features some of the most rugged topography in the Cascade Range with craggy peaks, ridges, and deep glacial valleys. Geological events occurring many years ago created the diverse topography and drastic elevation changes over the Cascade Range leading to the various climate differences.

The history of the formation of the Cascade Mountains dates back millions of years ago to the late Eocene Epoch. With the North American Plate overriding the Pacific Plate, episodes of volcanic igneous activity persisted.  In addition, small fragments of the oceanic and continental lithosphere called terranes created the North Cascades about 50 million years ago. Hinkhouse Peak is carved mostly from granite of the Golden Horn batholith.

During the Pleistocene period dating back over two million years ago, glaciation advancing and retreating repeatedly scoured the landscape leaving deposits of rock debris. The "U"-shaped cross section of the river valleys are a result of recent glaciation. Uplift and faulting in combination with glaciation have been the dominant processes which have created the tall peaks and deep valleys of the North Cascades area.

See also

 Geography of Washington (state)
 Geology of the Pacific Northwest

References

External links
 Hinkhouse Peak weather: Mountain Forecast

North Cascades
Mountains of Washington (state)
Mountains of Okanogan County, Washington
Mountains of Chelan County, Washington
Cascade Range
North American 2000 m summits